The Asian gray shrew (Crocidura attenuata) is a species of mammal in the family Soricidae. It is found in Bhutan, Cambodia, China, India, Laos, Malaysia, Myanmar, Nepal, Pakistan, the Philippines, Thailand, and Vietnam. It is one of the commonest species within its range and the International Union for Conservation of Nature has assessed its conservation status as being of "least concern".

Description
Its weight is in the range . The head and dorsal fur is dark greyish-black to smoky-brown and is a darker shade in the summer than in the winter. The underparts are dark grey and the tail dark brown above and mid-brown below.

Distribution and habitat
The Asian gray shrew is native to southeastern Asia. It is present in Cambodia, southeastern China, northern India, Lao People's Democratic Republic, Malaysia, Myanmar, the Philippines, Taiwan, Thailand and Vietnam, and possibly Indonesia. It inhabits a wide range of habitat types, including lowland and montane rainforest, bamboo forest, scrubland, herbaceous vegetation, and secondary forest adjoining streams and rivers.

Ecology
Like other members of the shrew subfamily Crocurinae, the Asian gray shrew is mainly insectivorous. it is a terrestrial species and active by day and by night. Its natural history has been little studied, but females carrying litters of four and five have been observed.

Status
The Asian gray shrew is in many parts of its range the most abundant species of shrew. No specific threats have been identified, but in some places, it is affected by habitat destruction and introduced predators. It is present in several protected areas and the International Union for Conservation of Nature has assessed its conservation status as being of "least concern".

References

Crocidura
Mammals of Asia
Mammals of Southeast Asia
Mammals of Bhutan
Mammals of China
Mammals of India
Mammals of Cambodia
Mammals of Malaysia
Mammals of Myanmar
Mammals of Nepal
Mammals of Pakistan
Mammals of Laos
Mammals of Thailand
Mammals of Vietnam
Mammals of the Philippines
Least concern biota of Asia
Mammals described in 1872
Taxonomy articles created by Polbot